The first competition weekend of the 2017–18 ISU Speed Skating World Cup was held at Thialf in Heerenveen, Netherlands, from Friday, 10 November until Sunday, 12 November 2017.

Schedule
The detailed event schedule:

Medal summary

Men's events

 In mass start, race points are accumulated during the race based on results of the intermediate sprints and the final sprint. The skater with most race points is the winner.

Women's events

 In mass start, race points are accumulated during the race based on results of the intermediate sprints and the final sprint. The skater with most race points is the winner.

References

1
ISU World Cup, 2017-18, 1
ISU Speed Skating World Cup, 2017-18, World Cup 1
2017 in Dutch sport
ISU Speed Skating World Cup